Lincoln Leadership Academy Charter School is a midsized, urban, public charter school located in Allentown, Pennsylvania. It is one of four public charter schools operating in Lehigh County, Pennsylvania.

As of the 2021-22 school year, enrollment was 812 in grades first through 12th. The school employed 25 teachers, yielding a student-teacher ratio of 16:57. In November 2012, the Allentown School District School Board renewed the charter school's agreement for five years, amid concerns regarding Lincoln Leadership Academy Charter School's association with a local church.

Lincoln Leadership Academy Charter School is one of four public charter schools operating in Lehigh County in 2013. According to the Pennsylvania Department of Education, in 2012, there were 50,605 children in Lehigh County who were enrolled in public charter schools.

The Carbon-Lehigh Intermediate Unit IU21 provides the district with a wide variety of services like specialized education for disabled students and hearing, speech and visual disability services and professional development for staff and faculty.

Extracurriculars
Lincoln Leadership Academy Charter School offers a wide variety of clubs, activities, and an extensive sports program.

Sports
Boys
Baseball - A
Basketball- A, varsity JV team, Freshman and MS teams

Girls
Basketball - A varsity and MS teams
Cheer - AAAA
Softball - A

According to PIAA directory July 2013 

All student-athletes are required to participate in concussion training at Lincoln Leadership Academy Charter School. All coaches at Lincoln Leadership are  mandated to pass a concussion awareness course before coaching the children. Parent have access to the free training.

References

Charter schools in Pennsylvania
Public elementary schools in Pennsylvania
Public high schools in Pennsylvania
Public middle schools in Pennsylvania
Schools in Allentown, Pennsylvania